Virginia v. Moore, 553 U.S. 164 (2008), is a Supreme Court of the United States case that addresses use of evidence obtained by police in a search incident to an arrest if that arrest is later found to be unlawful.

Background 
Two Portsmouth, Virginia police officers had probable cause to suspect that David Lee Moore was driving with a suspended license. Virginia state code authorizes the police to give a summons to, but not arrest, someone who is driving with a suspended license. The police, however, arrested Moore, and in a search subsequent to the arrest he was found to be carrying crack cocaine. At trial, Moore contested the state's use of the cocaine as evidence, arguing that the arrest, and therefore the search, was a violation of his rights under the Fourth Amendment to the United States Constitution.

Opinion of the Court 
The Court decided unanimously in favor of Virginia. In an opinion by Justice Antonin Scalia that was joined by seven justices, the Court held that because the Fourth Amendment was not written with the intent to incorporate individual states' arrest statutes and because the arrest was based on probable cause, Moore had no constitutional grounds to have the evidence suppressed.

Justice Ruth Bader Ginsburg wrote a separate concurring opinion and stated that there was less precedent for the majority opinion than is alluded to by Justice Scalia. Ginsburg's primary line of reasoning for ruling with the other eight justices lies in the fact that while Moore's arrest itself violated state law, the Virginia statute does not identify the suppression of evidence as a consequence of this violation.

See also 
 Knowles v. Iowa

References

External links
 

United States Supreme Court cases
United States Supreme Court cases of the Roberts Court
United States Fourth Amendment case law
Legal history of Virginia
Portsmouth, Virginia
2008 in United States case law 
Search and seizure case law